Odo of Bayeux (died 1097), Earl of Kent and Bishop of Bayeux, was the maternal half-brother of William the Conqueror, and was, for a time, second in power after the King of England.

Early life
Odo was the son of William the Conqueror's mother Herleva and Herluin de Conteville. Count Robert of Mortain was his younger brother. There is uncertainty about his birth date. Some historians have suggested he was born around 1035. Duke William made him bishop of Bayeux in 1049. It has been suggested that his birth was as early as 1030, making him about nineteen rather than fourteen at the time.

Norman Conquest and after
Although Odo was an ordained Christian cleric, he is best known as a warrior and statesman, participating in the Council of Lillebonne. He funded ships for the Norman invasion of England and is one of the very few proven companions of William the Conqueror known to have fought at the Battle of Hastings in 1066. The Bayeux Tapestry, probably commissioned by him to adorn his own cathedral, appears to labour the point that he did not actually fight, that is to say shed blood, at Hastings, but rather encouraged the troops from the rear. The Latin annotation embroidered onto the Tapestry above his image reads: "Hic Odo Eps [Episcopus] Baculu[m] Tenens Confortat Pueros", in English "Here Odo the Bishop holding a club strengthens the boys". It has been suggested that his clerical status forbade him from using a sword, though this is doubtful: the club was a common weapon and used often by leadership including by Duke William himself, as also depicted in the same part of the Tapestry. Odo was accompanied by William the carrier of his crozier and a retinue of servants and members of his household.

In 1067, Odo became Earl of Kent, and for some years he was a trusted royal minister. On some occasions when William was absent (back in Normandy), he served as regent of England, and at times he led the royal forces against rebellions (e.g. the Revolt of the Earls): the precise sphere of his powers is not certain. There are also other occasions when he accompanied William back to Normandy.

During this time Odo acquired vast estates in England, larger in extent than anyone except the king: he had land in twenty-three counties, primarily in the south east and in East Anglia.

Trial, imprisonment and rebellion
In 1076, at the Trial of Penenden Heath, Odo was tried in front of a large and senior assembly over the course of three days at Penenden Heath in Kent for defrauding the Crown and the Diocese of Canterbury. At the conclusion of the trial he was forced to return a number of properties and his assets were re-apportioned.

In 1082, Odo was suddenly disgraced and imprisoned for having planned a military expedition to Italy. His motives are not certain. Chroniclers writing a generation later said Odo desired to make himself pope during the Investiture Controversy while Pope Gregory VII was in severe difficulty in his conflict with Henry IV, Holy Roman Emperor, and the position of pope was in contention; but the contemporary evidence is ambiguous. Whatever the reason, Odo spent the next five years in prison and his English estates were taken back by the king, as was his office as Earl of Kent. Odo was not deposed as Bishop of Bayeux.

On his deathbed in 1087, King William I was reluctantly persuaded by his half-brother, Robert, Count of Mortain, to release Odo. After the king's death, Odo returned to England. William's eldest son, Robert Curthose, had been made duke of Normandy, while Robert's brother William Rufus had received the throne of England. The bishop supported Robert Curthose's claim to England. The Rebellion of 1088 failed and William Rufus permitted Odo to leave the kingdom. Afterwards, Odo remained in the service of Robert in Normandy.

Odo joined the First Crusade and started in the duke's company for Palestine, but died on the way at Palermo in January or February 1097. He was buried in Palermo Cathedral.

Commentary on Odo
William Stearns Davis writes in Life on a Medieval Barony (1923):

Bishop Odo of Bayeux fought at Hastings (1066) before any such authorized champions of the church existed. ...That bishops shall restrain from warfare is really a pious wish not easily in this sinful world to be granted.

Portrayals on screen
On screen, Odo has been portrayed by John Nettleton in the two-part BBC TV play Conquest (1966), part of the series Theatre 625, and by Denis Lill in the TV drama Blood Royal: William the Conqueror (1990).

Notes

References

 

Attribution

Further reading
Bates, David, 'The Character and Career of Odo, Bishop of Bayeux (1049/50–1097)', in: Speculum, vol. 50, pp. 1–20 (1975).
 

 Rowley, Trevor, The Man Behind the Bayeux Tapestry: Odo, William the Conqueror's Half-Brother (2013) 
 Nakashian, Craig M, Warrior Churchmen of Medieval England, 1000-1250 (Boydell & Brewer, 2016) 

|-

1030s births
1097 deaths
11th-century English nobility
Kent, Odon de Conteville
11th-century French Roman Catholic bishops
Bishops of Bayeux
Companions of William the Conqueror
Burials at Palermo Cathedral
Kent, Odo, Earl of
Christians of the First Crusade
William II of England
11th-century Normans